17β-Hydroxysteroid dehydrogenase type 14 also known as  17β-HSD type 14 or 17βHSD14 is an enzyme that in humans is encoded by the HSD17B14 gene.

17βHSD14 catalyzes the stereospecific oxidation and reduction of the 17β carbon atom of androgens and estrogens using NAD(P)(H) as a cofactor.  It is primarily expressed in glandular epithelial tissues of breast, ovary, and testis.

References

Enzymes